Thalis Henrique Cantanhede (born 19 March 1996), commonly known as Thalis, is a Brazilian footballer who plays as a midfielder for Portuguese club Leixões.

Career statistics

Club

References

1996 births
Living people
Brazilian footballers
Brazilian expatriate footballers
Association football midfielders
Campeonato Brasileiro Série A players
Campeonato Brasileiro Série B players
Liga Portugal 2 players
Clube Atlético Mineiro players
Desportivo Brasil players
Boa Esporte Clube players
Coimbra Esporte Clube players
U.D. Oliveirense players
Leixões S.C. players
Brazilian expatriate sportspeople in Portugal
Expatriate footballers in Portugal